The Zhangjiu River is a 120-km-long tributary of the Pudu River in Luquan Yi and Miao Autonomous County in the China province of Yunnan. It flows south across western Luquan County and joins Pudu River at Chahe village.

Notes

Rivers of Yunnan
Geography of Kunming